WRRR-FM (93.9 FM, "Lite Rock 93R") is an American radio station licensed to serve the community of St. Marys, West Virginia.  The station's broadcast license is held by Seven Ranges Radio Co., Inc.

WRRR-FM broadcasts an adult contemporary music format.  Originally using the slogan of W-3-R, the station is now branded as "Lite Rock 93R" and continues to provide coverage of a wide variety of local events, including sports.

On September 19, some people listen to WRRR's streaming audio to celebrate "Talk Like A Pirate Day", since the last three letters said aloud are "R-R-R".

External links
WRRR-FM official website

RRR
Mainstream adult contemporary radio stations in the United States
Radio stations established in 1983